Dipeptidyl-dipeptidase (dipeptidyl tetrapeptide hydrolase, dipeptidyl ligase, tetrapeptide dipeptidase) is an enzyme. This enzyme catalyses the following chemical reaction

 Preferential release of dipeptides from a tetrapeptide, e.g. Ala-Gly!Ala-Gly. Acts more slowly on Ala-Ala!Ala-Ala and Gly-Gly!Gly-Gly

This thiol-activated peptidase is isolated from cabbage (Brassica oleracea).

References

External links 
 

EC 3.4.14